Jason Martin may refer to:

 Jason Martin (American football) (born 1972), American football player
 Jason Martin (cricketer) (born 1995), Guernsey cricketer
 Jason Martin (musician), member of the indie rock band Starflyer 59
 Jason Martin (rugby league) (born 1970), Australian former rugby league footballer
 Jason Martin (artist) (born 1970), painter
 Jason Martin (baseball) (born 1995), American baseball player